Frank Thomas Whitney (February 18, 1856 – October 30, 1943) nicknamed "Jumbo", was an American Major League Baseball player.  He played outfield for the 1876 Boston Red Caps. His younger brother, Art Whitney, was also a professional baseball player.

External links

19th-century baseball players
Major League Baseball outfielders
Baseball players from Massachusetts
Boston Red Caps players
1856 births
1943 deaths
Lowell (minor league baseball) players
Worcester Grays players